The Korean Presbyterian Church (GaeHyuk I.) was formed in 1981, when it was separated from the Presbyterian Church in Korea (HapDong). In 1973 before HapDong was divided, about 400 neutral congregations formed a 17-member committee to promote reconciliation, but this effort proved useless. The non-mainline HapDong group separated and fragmented into JongAm and BangBae and GaeHyuk. An attempt was made to unite these churches without success. The GaeHyuk denomination birth date is 1981. The Apostles Creed and the Westminster Confession are the officially accepted standards. In 2004 it had 633,600 members and 2,030 congregations served by 2,010 ordained pastors in 31 Presbyteryes, and a General Assembly. There is currently no female ordination.

References 

Presbyterian denominations in South Korea